Jackie Morris (born 1961) is a British writer and illustrator. She was shortlisted for the Kate Greenaway Medal in 2016 and won it in 2019 for her illustration of The Lost Words, voted the most beautiful book of 2016 by UK booksellers. She is a recipient of the Tir na n-Og Award for children's book Seal Children.

Life
Morris was born in Birmingham in 1961. Her family moved to Evesham when she was four. As a child she was told that she couldn't be an artist, but despite this  she learned to paint. Morris went to High school at Prince Henry's High School in Evesham and afterward the Bath Academy of Art.

On leaving college she found work in editorial, illustrating magazines like Radio Times, New Statesman, New Society and Country Living. She worked for years illustrating books and in 2016, she was shortlisted for the Kate Greenaway Medal for Something About a Bear. The book includes her water colours of different types of bear.

She lives in a small house by the sea in Wales, painting and writing.

Career
The Lost Words is a book of "spells" by Robert Macfarlane with illustrations by Morris. The book has clues to words like acorn, blackberry and conker. The book was said to be inspired by 21st-century editions of the Oxford Junior Dictionary in which some words like kingfisher associated with nature were omitted in order to include technical terms like attachment, broadband and chatroom. In 2017, Laurence Rose organised a protest letter to the dictionary and it was signed by Margaret Atwood, Sara Maitland, Michael Morpurgo, Andrew Motion, Macfarlane, and Morris. Much debate ensued but the creative outcome was an idea for joint work by McFarlane and Morris. This book was voted the most beautiful book by UK booksellers in 2016.

An exhibition of The Lost Words was held at Compton Verney in 2017, featuring immersive floor to ceiling graphics of the poems and illustrations in the book. The exhibition subsequently toured Britain, hosted by the Foundling Museum in London, Inverleith House in Edinburgh, Royal Albert Museum in Exeter, and the North York Moors National Park’s art gallery in Danby.

A Welsh language version of The Lost Words 'Geiriau Diflanedig was published by Graffeg in 2019 with author Mererid Hopwood adapting Macfarlane's acrostic spell-poems within Morris' illustrations.

An audiobook of The Lost Words has been narrated by Guy Garvey, Edith Bowman, Benjamin Zephaniah, and Cerys Matthews, with ambient sound recordings Chris Watson.

Works
As author and illustrator
 Cities in the Sea (1996) with Sian Lewis
 The Seal Children (2004)
 Can You See a Little Bear (2005) with James Mayhew
 Compilation and illustration of The Barefoot Book of Classic Poems (2006)
 The Snow Leopard (2007)
 Tell Me a Dragon (2009)
 The Ice Bear (2010)
 The Cat and the Fiddle: A Treasury of Nursery Rhymes (2011)
 Queen of the Sky (2011)
 I am Cat (2012)
 Song of the Golden Hare (2013)
 East of the Sun, West of the Moon (2013)
 Words of Little Evie in the Wild Wood (2013) illustrated by Catherine Hyde
 Something About a Bear (2014)
 The Wild Swans (2015)
 Cat Walk (2015)
 The Quiet Music of Gently Falling Snow (2016)
 The While Fox (2016)
 The Lost Words (2017) with Robert Macfarlane
 Words of Mrs Noah's Pockets (2018) illustrated by James Mayhew
 The Secret of the Tattered Shoes (2019) with Ehsan Abdollahi 
 The Lost Spells (2020) with Robert Macfarlane

As illustrator
 The Snow Whale (1996) by Caroline Pitcher
 Out of the Ark: Stories from the World's Religions (1996) by Anita Ganeri 
 The Time of the Lion (1998) by Caroline Pitcher
 The Fourth Wise Man (1998) by Susan Summers
 Stories from the Stars: Greek Myths of the Zodiac (1998) by Juliet Sharman-Burke 
 Lord of the Dance (1998) by Sydney Carter
 Grandmother's Song (2000) by Barbara Soros
 New edition of How the Whale Became (1963) by Ted Hughes (2000)
 Marianna and the Merchild (2000) by Caroline Pitcher
 Parables: Stories Jesus Told (2000) by Mary Hoffman
 Animals of the Bible (2003) by Mary Hoffman
 Lord of the Forest (2004) by Caroline Pitcher
 Little One, We Knew You'd Come (2006) by Sally Lloyd-Jones
 Singing to the Sun (2008) by Vivian French
 Starlight Sailor (2013) by James Mayhew
 Walking on Water: Miracles Jesus Worked (2017) by Mary Hoffman
 Lost and Found: Parables Jesus Told (2017) by Mary Hoffman

Notable artwork
 Cover art for many books by Robin Hobb
 Three Hares print
 Judy Dyble's album, Talking with Strangers, featured her art for its second pressing

Awards and recognitions
Awards
 1997 Tir na n-O Award for Cities in the Sea
 2005 Tir na n-O Award for The Seal Children
 2017 Books Are My Bag Readers' Award for The Lost Words
 2019 Kate Greenaway Medal for The Lost Words

Shortlisted
 2016''' Kate Greenaway Medal for Something About a Bear''

References

External links

 Official website
 Official Instagram
 Official Twitter

1961 births
Living people
Alumni of Bath School of Art and Design
Artists from Birmingham, West Midlands
British children's writers
British illustrators
British children's book illustrators